The angkouch (Khmer: អង្គួច) is a Cambodian jaw harp. It is a folk instrument made of bamboo and carved into a long, flat shape with a hole in the center and a tongue of bamboo across the hole. The bamboo is not removable, which makes the instrument an idioglot.

There is also a metal variety, more round or tree-leaf shaped. It may also have metal bells attached.

The instrument is both a wind instrument and percussion instrument. As a wind instrument, it is played by placing it against the mouth and plucking the reed. The hand holding the instrument holds it with the thumb and forefinger facing each other, holding it firmly. This adds mass to the instrument and makes it louder. The mouth acts as a resonator and as a tool to alter the sound. Although mainly a folk instrument, better-made examples exist. While the instrument was thought to be the invention of children herding cattle, it is sometimes used in public performance, to accompany the Mahori music in public dancing.

References

External links
Picture of Anghouch with bell
Sound clip of an angkouch jew's harp being played.
Picture of angkouch that shows the instrument's tongue clearly.

Cambodian musical instruments